Pseudopercis is a genus of bony fish which are part of the family Pinguipedidae, the sandperches. They are from the coastal waters of South America and are distinguished from other Neotropical sandperches in their more robust heads and bodies.

Species
There are two recognised species in the genus Pseudopercis:

 Pseudopercis numida Miranda Ribeiro, 1903 - Namorado sandperch
 Pseudopercis semifasciata (Cuvier, 1829) - Argentinian sandperch

References

Pinguipedidae